Arthur Hugh Elsdale Molson, Baron Molson, PC (29 June 1903 – 13 October 1991) was a British Conservative politician and member of the Molson family of Montreal.

Life and career
Born in Chelmsford, Essex, he was the only surviving son of Major John Elsdale Molson, Member of Parliament for Gainsborough from 1918 to 1923, and Mary Leeson. He was educated at the Royal Naval College, Osborne, and Dartmouth, at Lancing, and at New College, Oxford. 

At Lancing, Molson was a contemporary and close friend of Evelyn Waugh, and known as "Luncher". To the young Waugh, he represented a figure of louche daring, as evidenced by many suggestive but mostly inexplicit references in his published letters and diaries. They were less close from Oxford onwards.

Molson was President of the Oxford Union in 1925 and graduated with first-class honours in Jurisprudence in 1925. He worked as Political Secretary of the Associated Chambers of Commerce of India from 1926 to 1929, then he became a barrister-at-law at the Inner Temple in 1931.

He was commissioned on 4 March 1939 and served with the 36th (Middlesex) Searchlight Regiment, Royal Artillery from 1939 to 1941. He was Staff Captain with the 11th Anti-Aircraft Division from 1941 to 1942.

Molson was the unsuccessful Conservative candidate in Aberdare in 1929, then sat as Member of Parliament (MP) for Doncaster from 1931 to 1935 and for High Peak, Derbyshire, from 1939 to 1961. He was elected unopposed at the 1939 High Peak by-election, after the death of Alfred Law. He held Ministerial office as Parliamentary Secretary to the Ministry of Works from 1951 to 1953, Joint Parliamentary Secretary to the Ministry of Transport and Civil Aviation from November 1953 to January 1957, and as Minister of Works from 1957 until October 1959. He was a Member of the Monckton Commission on Rhodesia and Nyasaland in 1960, and Chairman of the Commission of Privy Counsellors on the dispute between Buganda and Bunyoro in 1962.

In 1949, Molson married Nancy Astington, daughter of W.H. Astington of Bramhall, Cheshire. He was appointed a Privy Counsellor in 1956, and was created a Life Peer on 21 February 1961 as Baron Molson, of High Peak in the County of Derby.

In later life, Molson was Chairman (1968–71) and President (1971–80) of the Council for the Protection of Rural England. He died at Westminster in 1991, aged 88.

Notable quotations
 "I will look at any additional evidence to confirm the opinion to which I have already come."

Arms

See also
 Canadian peers and baronets

References

External links
 

1903 births
1991 deaths
Military personnel from Chelmsford
Royal Artillery officers
Conservative Party (UK) MPs for English constituencies
Conservative Party (UK) life peers 
People educated at Lancing College
Members of the Privy Council of the United Kingdom
Members of the Parliament of the United Kingdom for constituencies in Derbyshire
UK MPs 1931–1935
UK MPs 1935–1945
UK MPs 1945–1950
UK MPs 1950–1951
UK MPs 1951–1955
UK MPs 1955–1959
UK MPs 1959–1964
UK MPs who were granted peerages
Alumni of New College, Oxford
Presidents of the Oxford Union
Presidents of the Oxford University Conservative Association
Members of the Inner Temple
People from Chelmsford
20th-century British lawyers
People educated at the Royal Naval College, Osborne
High Peak, Derbyshire
Hugh
Ministers in the third Churchill government, 1951–1955
Ministers in the Eden government, 1955–1957
Ministers in the Macmillan and Douglas-Home governments, 1957–1964
Life peers created by Elizabeth II